The .219 Donaldson Wasp cartridge was developed during the late 1930s by Harvey Donaldson, and is derived from the .219 Zipper case. Cases have been formed from .25-35 Winchester, .30-30 Winchester, and [.22 Savage Hi-Power]] brass. It quickly became very popular amongst benchrest shooters, with 70-80% of shooters winning matches using it. The introduction of the .222 Remington spelled the demise for the .219 Donaldson Wasp, though it remains a very capable cartridge for those interested in reloading.

References

See also
List of rifle cartridges

Pistol and rifle cartridges
Wildcat cartridges